Kvarkush is a mountain range in North Ural, in Perm Krai, Russia. It is located in the basin of the Vishera River, between the Uls River and upstream of the Yayva River. Its highland swamps are the source of many rivers and streams.

Etymology 
The name of the mountain range is derived from the Mansi word kvar-kush that literally means "naked (unforested) Ural". The name of Vogulsky Kamen derives from the name of the Mansi people, formerly called voguly by Russian people.

External links 
The plateau Kvarkush
Kvarkush Mountain Range

Mountains of Perm Krai